The men's hammer throw event at the 2007 Pan American Games was held on July 25.

Results

References
Official results

Hammer
2007